Mauro Astrada (born November 14, 1980 in Chabás, Argentina) is an Argentine footballer currently playing for Unión Temuco of the Primera B Chilena.

Teams
  Boca Juniors 2000-2002
  Sportivo Italiano 2002-2003
  RCD Mallorca B 2003-2005
  Sportivo Italiano 2005-2006
  Temperley 2006-2007
  Deportivo Merlo 2007
  Duque de Caxias 2008
  Luján de Cuyo 2008-2009
  Gimnasia y Esgrima de Mendoza 2009-2010
  Unión Temuco 2011–present

References
 Mauro Astrada at BDFA.com.ar 

1980 births
Living people
Argentine footballers
Argentine expatriate footballers
Argentine expatriate sportspeople in Spain
Boca Juniors footballers
Gimnasia y Esgrima de Mendoza footballers
RCD Mallorca B players
Unión Temuco footballers
Primera B de Chile players
Expatriate footballers in Chile
Expatriate footballers in Brazil
Expatriate footballers in Spain
Association football goalkeepers